Pope Paul IV (r. 1555–1559) created 19 cardinals in four consistories.

June 7, 1555

 Carlo Carafa

December 20, 1555

 Juan Martínez Silíceo
 Gianbernardino Scotti
 Diomede Carafa
 Scipione Rebiba
 Jean Suau
 Johann Gropper
 Gianantonio Capizucchi

March 15, 1557

 Taddeo Gaddi
 Antonio Trivulzio, iuniore
 Lorenzo Strozzi
 Virgilio Rosario
 Jean Bertrand
 Michele Ghislieri
 Clemente d'Olera
 Alfonso Carafa
 Vitellozzo Vitelli
 Giovanni Battista Consiglieri

June 14, 1557

 William Petow

References

Paul IV
16th-century Catholicism
College of Cardinals